Walter Beck may refer to:

 Boom-Boom Beck (Walter William Beck, 1904–1987), American pitcher in Major League Baseball
 Walter Beck (gymnast) (1907–?), Swiss gymnast